Jack Coventry (born 5 March 1994) is a professional rugby league footballer who plays as a  for the Dewsbury Rams in RFL Championship.

Coventry has previously spent time on loan at the Hunslet in Betfred League One.

He previously played for Featherstone in the Betfred Championship.

References

External links
Hunslet profile
Hunslet Hawks profile
Featherstone Rovers profile

1994 births
Living people
Dewsbury Rams players
English rugby league players
Featherstone Rovers players
Hunslet R.L.F.C. players
Keighley Cougars players
Oldham R.L.F.C. players
Rugby league props